Simoom is a strong, dry, dust-laden local wind in Sahara, Palestine, Jordan, Syria, and the Arabian Peninsula.

Simoom may also refer to:

"Simoon", a song by Japanese electronic band Yellow Magic Orchestra on their first album
HMS Simoom, six different ships of the Royal Navy
Operation Simoom, a Polish intelligence operation
Simoom Sound, a sound on the Central Coast of British Columbia 
Simoom Sound, British Columbia, the post office located on the sound
"Simoom", a song by the Creatures on their album Boomerang
Project Simoom, a Swedish and Saudi Arabian military project
Simoom (album) by composer Lois V Vierk
Simoom Hill, a hill on the western Antarctic Peninsula
Simoom, a one-act play by August Strindberg
Simoom, a Djinni in the video game Golden Sun: Dark Dawn

See also 
 Simoun (disambiguation)